Anna Liisa Kontula (born 1977) is a Finnish sociologist and an MP since 2011. Until 2017, she was also a member of the city council of Tampere. In 2019, Kontula declared herself the only communist in the current Finnish parliament and predicted that the economic system would collapse.

Biography
Anna Kontula was born on 30 March 1977 in Pori, Satakunta, Finland. She completed her master's thesis in 2002 concerning the student movement of the 1970's. She has completed multiple research projects on prostitution in Finland, such as a 2008 report published by the University of Tampere. Her work has also included evaluating the criminalization of prostitution and violence toward women. She has researched many subjects, evaluating work restrictions, cultural norms and perceptions including attitudes towards public breast-feeding, aging construction workers, the impact of racism in the workplace and in housing among other topics.

She has served as the vice chairman of the Sex Industry Association, and was involved in many organizations dealing with social activism during her school years. In 2004, Kontula was elected in the municipal elections to the Tampere City Council. In 2008, she was elected again, and on both the 2008 and the 2012 elections, Kontula had the second largest number of votes of any Left Alliance candidate.

Kontula was first elected to the Finnish Parliament in 2011, representing the Pirkanmaa constituency from the Left Alliance. She is a member of the Committee for the Future and the Employment and Equality Committee, having previously served on the Constitutional Law Committee and the Employment and Equality Committee.

On Monday 13 January 2020, She was arrested along with other members of an international group of human rights activists near the Gaza Strip in Israel for trying to pass through a border fence. She said the group's aim was to bring attention to the humanitarian crisis in Gaza by crossing the border between Israel and Gaza. Taneli Hämäläinen, Kontula's Parliamentary Assistant, said on the next day that Kontula had been released after more than ten hours in custody and that the Israeli authorities had tried to press her to sign a statement that acknowledged the charges against her, such as obstructing the investigation and jeopardizing public safety. However, she refused to sign the document.

Selected works
 Prostituutio Suomessa Helsinki: Sexpo-säätiö (2005) (in Finnish)
 "The Sex Worker and Her Pleasure" Current Sociology, Vol. 56, no. 4 (2008): pp 605–620(in English)
 Punainen eksodus: tutkimus seksityöstä Suomessa Helsinki: Like (2008) (in Finnish)
 Tästä äiti varoitti Helsinki: Like (2009)() (in Finnish)
 Countering Trafficking in Moldova Chisinau: International Organization for Migration (2009)
 Näkymätön kylä: Siirtotyöläisten asemasta Suomessa Helsinki: Like: Into (2010) (in Finnish)
 Mistä ei voi puhua Helsinki: Like (2012) (in Finnish)
 Kirjeitä oikealle Helsinki: Into (2014) (in Finnish)

References

External links
 

1977 births
Living people
People from Pori
Left Alliance (Finland) politicians
Members of the Parliament of Finland (2011–15)
Members of the Parliament of Finland (2015–19)
Members of the Parliament of Finland (2019–23)
21st-century Finnish women politicians
Finnish sociologists
Finnish women sociologists
Finnish feminists